DC Shadow is a Premier Ultimate League (PUL) professional women's ultimate team based in Washington, D.C. They joined the PUL as part of the 2020 expansion but as a result of the league's decision to cancel the 2020 season due to the COVID-19 pandemic they have not yet competed. The Shadow's mission is to "advance gender equity in the sport of ultimate by actively engaging in the development of youth ultimate, strengthening ties between area college and club players, and increasing accessibility to and visibility of womxn ultimate players."

Franchise history 
On December 3, 2019 the PUL, which held its inaugural season in 2019, announced that it would be adding 4 new teams, including the DC Shadow, Milwaukee Monarchs, Portland Rising, and Minnesota Strike.

Leadership team 

 Dave Tornquist - President/Treasurer
 Kevin Wolf - Vice President
 Barbara Thaw - Secretary

Current coaching staff 

 Head coach – Allison Maddux
 Assistant coach (Strategy & Defense) - Chance Cochran
 Assistant coach (Strategy & Offense) - John Agan
 Assistant coach (Operations & Community Liaison) - Kelly Ross

All-time head coaches

Roster

References

External links 

Premier Ultimate League teams
Ultimate (sport) teams
Ultimate teams established in 2020
2020 establishments in Washington, D.C.